Jane Eyre is a 1983 British television serial adaptation of Charlotte Brontë's 1847 novel of the same name, produced by BBC and directed by Julian Amyes. The serial stars Zelah Clarke as the title character, and Timothy Dalton as Edward Rochester. It was originally broadcast in eleven 30 minute weekly episodes. Deene Park, located near Corby, Northamptonshire was used as the setting of Rochester's Thornfield Hall.

Cast

References

External links

Review at the Timothy Dalton Official Home Page
Review at JaneEyre.net
An Enthusiast's Guide to Jane Eyre Adaptations - broken link

1983 British television series debuts
1983 British television series endings
BBC television dramas
Television series set in the 19th century
Television shows based on British novels
Films based on Jane Eyre